Sydney Football Club is an Australian professional association football club based in Moore Park, Sydney. The club was formed in 2004. They became the first New South Wales member admitted into the A-League in 2005.

There have been nine permanent and one caretaker managers of Sydney FC since 2004; Steve Corica has managed the club in two separate spells as permanent and caretaker between 2012 and 2020. The most successful person to manage Sydney FC is Graham Arnold, who won two A-League premierships, one A-League championship and one FFA Cup between 2014 and 2018. Arnold is the club's longest-serving manager.

This chronological list comprises all those who have held the position of manager of the first team of Sydney FC since their foundation in 2004. Each manager's entry includes his dates of tenure and the club's overall competitive record (in terms of matches won, drawn and lost), honours won and significant achievements while under his care. Caretaker managers are included, where known, as well as those who have been in permanent charge.

Managers

 Manager dates are sourced from WorldFootball.net for all managers. Statistics and nationalities are sourced from SFCStatistics.com for Littbarski to Corica. Names of caretaker managers are supplied where known, and periods of caretaker management are highlighted in italics and marked caretaker or caretaker, then permanent appointment, depending on the scenario. Win percentage is rounded to two decimal places.
 Only first-team competitive matches are counted. Wins, losses and draws are results at the final whistle; the results of penalty shoot-outs are not counted.
 Statistics are complete up to and including the match played on 8 O.

Key
M = matches played; W = matches won; D = matches drawn; L = matches lost; GF = Goals for; GA = Goals against; Win % = percentage of total matches won
  Managers with this background and symbol in the "Name" column are italicised to denote caretaker appointments.
  Managers with this background and symbol in the "Name" column are italicised to denote caretaker appointments promoted to full-time manager.

References
Specific

 
Lists of soccer managers by club in Australia
Sydney-sport-related lists